The SIRET code (French: Système d’identification du répertoire des établissements), or SIRET number, is an INSEE code which allows the geographic identification of any French establishment or business.

Construction 
This 14-figure numerical identifier is split into two parts: 
 the first is the SIREN code of the legal unit to which the SIRET unit belongs;
 the second is usually called the NIC (internal ranking number; French: Numéro interne de classement), and is made up of a four-figure number attributed to the establishment and a control figure used to validate the SIRET number as a whole.

For example, 732 829 320 00074 would refer to the seventh establishment (followed by 4 as the check digit) of the business with SIREN number 732 829 320.

Notable exceptions 
SIRET is not always a simple 14-digit number. In certain geographic areas like Monaco, it can also be a series of alphanumeric characters, for example, MONACOCONFO001.

Calculating a valid code 
The SIRET number's check digit (the last) that verifies the validity of the SIRET number (SIREN + NIC). It is calculated using the Luhn formula.

See also 
 INSEE
 SIREN code

References

External links 
 Definition on the INSEE website
 SIRENE database

National identification numbers